Noradrenergic cells in medulla may refer to:
 Noradrenergic cell group A1
 Noradrenergic cell group A2